Strmovo may refer to:

 Strmovo (Bajina Bašta), a village in Serbia
 Strmovo (Lajkovac), a village in Serbia
 Strmovo (Lazarevac), a village in Serbia